CAI Learning Academy is an independent, non-sectarian day school located in Allentown, Pennsylvania. The school was founded in 2014 by Tony Salvaggio, the chief executive officer of Computer Aid Inc. to provide a technology-enhanced learning environment for elementary and middle school students in the Lehigh Valley. As of 2018, the school enrolls grades K-4 and plans to expand by one grade level each school year until becoming a full K-8 school in September 2022.

History
Computer Aid Inc, an Allentown-area IT consulting firm, has developed solutions for technology integration in elementary and middle school education. The firm saw an opportunity to open its own charter school in Allentown, which would incorporate hands-on activities and iPad e-reading applications.

The school originally was proposed to be located at a former Catholic school building then owned by the Allentown Diocese. While the charter school application received some support, it was ultimately rejected because the school "contained no evidence of support whatsoever by parents or students." This led to the founding of the private school at the same location since the licensing process of independent schools is much more lenient than in charter schools. The school opened in September 2014 to 70 kindergarten students.

Tuition and financial aid
Annual tuition for all grade levels is $4,000. More than three-quarters of all students receive some form of financial aid and the vast majority of the school's funding comes from donations through Computer Aid Inc.

References

Education in Allentown, Pennsylvania
Schools in Allentown, Pennsylvania
Private middle schools in Pennsylvania
Private elementary schools in Pennsylvania
Educational institutions established in 2014
2014 establishments in Pennsylvania